Hazarganji Chiltan National Park is a national park in the Mastung District of western Balochistan Province of Pakistan. It lies between Chiltan on its west and Hazarganji on the east. The park was established in 1980 to provide the habitat to rare Chiltan ibexes found in the area.

It was established in 1980 and covers 325,000 acre of land located close to the Koh-i-Chiltan mountain in Quetta's outskirt.

Etymology
The name comes from the travelling route between the mountains called "Hazarganji", which means (of a thousand treasures) in native language as it was a historical passage for the Greco-Bactrian, the Mongols, the Scythians and migrating hordes of Baloch tribes.

Biodiversity
The biodiversity of this park comprises 30 species of mammals (9 species of large mammals and 21 species of small mammals), 120 species of avifauna (36 resident and 84 migratory) and 30 species of reptiles.

Flora
The trees in the forests include Pashtun Juniper (Juniperus macropoda), pistachio, almond, and ash trees.

Fauna
The fauna comprises about 300-400 rare Sulaiman Markhor and around 800 Chiltan ibex survive within the park boundaries.
Few urials still survives in the western slopes between 1,500 m to 2,100 m.
Other fauna includes Indian wolf, striped hyena, Baluchistan leopard, caracal, common jackal and Indian crested porcupine.
Birds includes the very rare Houbara bustard, griffon vulture, Egyptian vulture, crested honey buzzard (winters only), laggar falcon, peregrine falcon, common kestrel, Eurasian sparrowhawk (winters only), Indian scops owl, Indian cuckoo, European bee-eater (breeding only), chukar partridge, European nightjar (breeding/summer only), long-billed pipit, Eastern Orphean warbler, variable wheatear, blue rock thrush, whinchat, white-browed bush chat and Lichtenstein's desert finch and reptiles are also found here likes of monitor lizards, Russell's viper, saw-scaled vipers and spiny-tailed lizards.

Species

Mammals
Total 30 species of mammals include:

Avifauna

Chiltan express
This train used to have a Quetta-Lahore route via Dera Ghazi Khan and Kot Adu Jn. This route opened in 1973, hence the Chiltan Express likely started operations on or after that year.
Over the years the route of the Chiltan Express has been varied many times by running it between Quetta and Peshawar via Faisalabad, between Quetta and Rawalpindi via Lahore, and these days between Quetta and Lahore via Faisalabad.

References

External links
 کوہ چلتن
 Lonely Planet: Hazarganji-Chiltan National Park 
Wildlife Pakistan Website: park Information - Hazarganji-Chiltan National Park

National parks of Pakistan
Sulaiman Mountains
Quetta District
Deserts of Pakistan
Forests of Pakistan
Protected areas of Balochistan, Pakistan
Natural history of Balochistan, Pakistan

ur:ہزار گنجی چلتن نیشنل پارک